Norway competed at the 1956 Summer Olympics in Melbourne, Australia and Stockholm, Sweden (equestrian events). 22 competitors, 19 men and 3 women, took part in 18 events in 6 sports.

Athletics

Canoeing

Equestrian

Individual dressage
Else Christophersen
Anne-Lise Kielland
Bodil Russ

Team dressage
Else Christophersen
Anne-Lise Kielland
Bodil Russ

Individual jumping
Birck Elgaaen

Sailing

Shooting

Five shooters represented Norway in 1956.

50 m rifle, three positions
 Erling Kongshaug
 Anker Hagen

50 m rifle, prone
 Erling Kongshaug
 Anker Hagen

100m running deer
 Rolf Bergersen
 John Larsen

Trap
 Hans Aasnæs

Wrestling

References

External links
Official Olympic Reports
International Olympic Committee results database

Nations at the 1956 Summer Olympics
1956
1956 in Norwegian sport